Religion & Education is a triannual peer-reviewed academic journal that covers religion and spirituality in elementary, secondary, and higher education settings. It is published by Routledge and the editor-in-chief is Michael Waggoner (University of Northern Iowa).

History 
The journal was established in 1983 as Religion and Public Education by the National Council on Religion and Public Education. The founding editor-in-chief was Charles Kniker.

Abstracting and indexing 
The journal is abstracted or indexed in:
 Education Research Index
 EBSCO databases
 MLA International Bibliography
 Religion Index One: Periodicals
 Répertoire International de Littérature Musicale
 Referativny Zhurnal

References

External links
 

Religious studies journals
Publications established in 1983
Triannual journals
Taylor & Francis academic journals
English-language journals